Drumchapel RFC was an early twentieth-century East Dunbartonshire-based rugby union club; the town – after being annexed in 1938 – now resides in Glasgow.

History

Sporting beginnings

In the early nineteenth century, the New Kilpatrick district of Drumchapel was traditionally geared towards farming and mining. The most common sport played was the farmers' ploughing match; other sports only getting formally played at the annual agricultural shows. The population was spread between the village, the Peel Glen mining rows, the hamlet of Townhead and the ancient baronies of Garscadden and Drumry.

This rural idyll changed with the introduction of a railway station to Drumchapel in 1891. Almost immediately afterwards Drumchapel became sought-after as a commuter village to Glasgow. It was still regarded as 'a pretty place' for day trips and its population rapidly grew. Sports like rugby union, football, golf and tennis took over from the ploughing matches. Drumchapel FC  were holding open days to attract players at the end of 1896; and were notably open on New Years Day 1897. Neighbouring athletic clubs regularly ran courses through Drumchapel. By the onset of the First World War the population of Drumchapel village alone was around 750 people.

Formation of the rugby club

It is not known the precise date of the formation of the club; but it is likely rugby must have been played in Drumchapel before the turn of the twentieth century. A Drumchapel youngster, a W. Finnigan, is noted as winning a juvenile place-kicking tournament at a Knightswood Brass Band event on 24 June 1896. He kicked the furthest with a distance of 128 feet and 8 inches.

One of the first instances noted of Drumchapel RFC was the match on 30 September 1905; when the Drumchapel side played a second XV of Hillhead HSFP.

Ground

The club played its matches at Thirdpart in the neighbouring village of Yoker. Thirdpart is now the site of Peterson Park; the home of the Glasgow Mid Argyll shinty side.

Towards the Championship title

Until they joined a formal league Drumchapel had to negotiate their own fixtures. Fortunately, many top national championship sides had 2XV and 3XV sides desperate to play; and invitational sides like Rowans Engineers and A. Brown's XV - the Midlands side run by the Cupar RFC player A. J. G. Brown - filled the void.

The Drumchapel team rapidly improved season by season. At the start of the 1907–08 season Charles Stuart, C. L. Vermont, T. Inglis and C. H. Stewart stood out in a game against Hillhead HSFP 2XV. Stuart would later represent Scotland and Inglis would represent the League.

Glasgow Rangers came calling for Charles Stuart to offer a professional football contract; but Charles' father Charles Douglas Stuart senior, an old Royal HSFP player, instead enrolled his son with Uddingston RFC; that bit further from Glasgow.

Western Junior League

Just below the national championship league were regional leagues classed as 'junior' leagues; the Western Junior League made up of West of Scotland teams was one such regional league.

Tough start

Drumchapel entered the new Western Junior League in 1908. They were up against Old Larchfieldians, Stirling HSFP, Bellahouston Academicals FP, Lenzie, Kilmarnock, Bishopbriggs, Falkirk and Uddingston.

The improvement was noted on the opening league day of the 1908–09 season; Drumchapel were beaten away by Bellahouston Academicals at Norwood by a slender 3 points; but it was reported that they were due at least a draw from the match; that they didn't have all their usual first team players in the matchday squad; and that Bellahouston had won last year's match at Thirdpart by 20 points. However, despite seeing an improvement in performances, the side ended up bottom of the table – from 12 league matches played, they recorded only 2 wins, 2 draws and the rest were losses. The Helensburgh side Old Larchfieldians won the league with 9 matches played, all won; their match with Drumchapel resulting in a tight 9–8 win.

Champions

The improvements in performance over that first league season helped drive local participation and Drumchapel RFC had enough players to make up three sides the following season (1909–10). In December 1909 the rugby club had a successful Café-chantant fundraiser in the Academy Rooms in Partick which raised £40. The 1st team won the Western Junior league title in season 1909–10.

Building on success

In the off season, before the new season campaign of 1910–11, the club built a new pavilion at Thirdpart. This was noted to particularly help the comfort of visiting teams.

Opening the pavilion, on 24 September 1910, were Drumchapel's usual pre-season fixture side, Rowans Engineers. The Engineers side were an invitational side run by former Drumchapel player (and then West of Scotland player and Scotland international) Charles Stuart.  Nicknamed 'the black squad', the Rowans side that day was:-

D. Dunlop (Glasgow Academicals), J. Murray-Campbell (West of Scotland). Val. Reid (Clydesdale), T. W. Rutherford (Glasgow University), and R. McNaught (Uddingston); W. Ross (Bearsden), and J. L. Bowman (Clydesdale); Charles Stuart (capt.) (West of Scotland), T. E. Campbell (West  of Scotland), E. W. Izard (West  of Scotland), W. M. Biggart (Clydesdale), W. Smith (Moseley), J. D. Stuart (Uddingston), D. Duncan (Uddingston), and J. W. Reid (Uddingston).

The fixtures of 1910–11 season were roughly the same as last year's Championship season but with the added novelty of two Edinburgh sides.

The 1911–12 season saw the club able to tour to Carlisle and one of the Border teams. The club has a committee and the Head Coach and captain is named as W. S. McLeod. The club secretary is given as S.A. Longmoor c/o White Street in Partick. There was no preseason fixture against Rowan Engineers as Charles Stuart went abroad. A preseason holiday match with Aberdeen GSFP was the alternative.

As Drumchapel strengthened other sides began poaching their players. A. A. Cruickshank was signed by Hillhead HSFP for the start of the 1912–13 season. Drumchapel's half-back R. Cuthbertson made the front page of The Scottish Referee, a sports newspaper, as a player to watch for the season.

The 1913–14 season saw Clydesdale sign some of the best Drumchapel players for their 1st team's bid for the Scottish national championship. This is yet another indicator of Drumchapel's rise on the rugby stage; in 1906 the Thirdpart side was pitched against Clydesdale's 4th team.

Selected matches

Matches reported in newspapers. Only 1st team matches shown. Drumchapel try-scorers noted where given.

Impact of the First World War

Considering a population of only 750, it seems remarkable that the club could attract around 50 men to fill three XVs sides to consistently play throughout the season. However, the enlistment of Drumchapel men to fight in the First World War in 1914 is all the more remarkable. Around 100 men of the village signed up; and it was said that Drumchapel had the biggest proportionate enlistment in Scotland.

The Scottish Referee of 18 September 1914 has an early list of rugby players signing up for service in the Great War: among them are listed the Drumchapel RFC players:- J.A. Stewart, W. Cramb and Charles Hugh Stewart. They were put in charge of a Red Cross detachment and had already left for France.

Fifteen Drumchapel men died in the Great War; their names marked at the St. Andrews Church cenotaph.

In rugby terms:- by the end of the War, Drumchapel had not enough men that were fit to play in a single XV team. The club folded.

It seems very likely that the Campbell that scored a try for Drumchapel against Cluny RFC on 14 March 2014 was one of four brothers James, John, Robert and Thomas Campbell - that all died in the First World War.

One of Drumchapel's star players Alexander Allan Cruickshank, who was selected for the Western League representative side, went to school at Dumbarton and then Hillhead High School. His name is thus mentioned in the 1921 Hillhead High School war memorial book:
A. ALLAN CRUICKSHANK

Lance Corporal, 17th Battalion Highland Light Infantry

Lance-Corporal Cruickshank (1888-1916) was the eldest son of the late Mr. A. A. Cruickshank [Alexander Allan Cruikshank (1859-1915)], Inland Revenue. He was educated at Dumbarton Academy and Hillhead High School. At School he took a keen interest in all games, and was much esteemed both by his fellows and his teachers. On leaving School he kept up his interest in games, and for several years he was a prominent figure in Drumchapel Rugby team, and later in Clydesdale. When war broke out he was in the employment of Messrs. Blackburn, King & Co., iron ore merchants, St. Vincent Street. He did not take long to decide where the path of duty lay, and was one of the first to join the newly formed Chamber of Commerce Battalion. He left for France in November, 1915, and came safely through till the beginning of the Great Push on the 1st of July, 1916. Since then he has been posted as missing, and the most diligent inquiries have failed to find any trace of him. The deepest sympathy is felt for his widowed mother [Isabella Cuthbertson Cruickshank], who had another son wounded in the same engagement.

His death is recorded as 1 July 1916 on the war records.

Honours

 Western Junior League
 Champions (1) : 1909-10

Notable former players

Western Junior League players

The following former Drumchapel players represented the Western Junior League team to play other League and District teams.

Glasgow District players

The following former Drumchapel players went on to represent Glasgow District.

Scotland international players

The following former Drumchapel players went on to represent Scotland.

References

Scottish rugby union teams
Rugby union in Glasgow
Sports teams in Glasgow
Defunct Scottish rugby union clubs
Rugby clubs established in 1905
Drumchapel
Rugby union clubs disestablished in 1914
1905 establishments in Scotland